Ashraf Johaardien (born 1974) is a multi-award winning playwright, actor, and producer. He was the recipient of the inaugural PANSA Jury Award (2002), was listed as one of Mail & Guardian's 'Top 200 Young South Africans' (2008) and he received a Legends Award (2012) for his achievements in arts and culture.

Biography
He was born in Cape Town in 1974 and was schooled in South Africa and the UK. He holds an International Baccalaureate from United World College of the Atlantic in Wales, a Bachelor of Arts Degree and an English Honors Degree from the University of Cape Town, a Postgraduate Diploma in Leadership from the University of Johannesburg and a Research master's degree from the University of the Witwatersrand.

His career in the arts encompasses professional and creative roles across a spectrum of disciplines. He has held senior management and leadership positions with key South African cultural and academic organisations (Iziko Museums of Cape Town, Baxter Theatre: University of Cape Town, Film & Publications Board, Centre for the Book: National Library, Arts & Culture Trust, Wits Theatre: University of the Witwatersrand, UJ Arts & Culture: University of Johannesburg). He was the Executive Producer of the National Arts Festival and the Cape Town Fringe, from July 2016 to February 2019. He took up the position of Chief Executive Officer of Business and Arts South Africa (BASA) in March 2019.

His plays include Coloured Son X, Salaam Stories/SALAAM, Happy Endings Are Extra, STRIPPED, Miracle*, Ecce Homo! adapted from Tim Miller's Body Blows and The Quiet Violence of Dreams based on the novel by K. Sello Duiker. His work has been performed and produced at mainstream theatres and festivals in South Africa, Ireland, the UK, the Netherlands and the USA. He has been published by Compress, Just Done Productions Publishing, Oxford University Press, Waverly Books (Glasgow) and Umuzi (Random House). He is also the author of The Perfumed Closet, a monthly gay column published in The Pink Tongue (Independent Newspapers) and he went on to compile a collection of queer South African writing entitled "Yes, I am!" with Robin Malan.

He played the title role in the film Sando to Samantha (Cape Town, Johannesburg, New York, Toronto, Paris, San Francisco, Chicago, Turin, Adelaide, Bologna, Brussels, Melbourne and Lisbon) directed by Jack Lewis.  Television credits include the role of Lucas in season 4 of the SABC 3 drama series Hard Copy produced by Quizzical Pictures. He originated the role of Boy in the devised play SUIP! as part of a student ensemble at the University of Cape Town (1993). He performed the role of Lawrence with two different casts in the South African and Irish productions of The Myth of Andrew and Jo by Gideon van Eeden (2010). He also originated the solo Hamlet of iHAMLET which was adapted specifically for him to perform by Robin Malan (2012).

Plays and publications

Coloured Son X
 Baxter Theatre Centre, CT, SA (1998)
 Circle East Theatre Company, NY, USA (2001)
 Published by Compress

Salaam Stories/SALAAM
 Spier/PANSA Festival of New Writing (2002)
 Theatre Row, New York City (2002)
 Spier Summer Arts Festival (2003)
 University of the Western Cape (2003)
 Baxter Theatre Centre (2003 & 2004)
 Darling Festival (2004)
 Oval House Theatre, London (2006)
 Grahamstown National Arts Festival (2006)
 South African National Schools Festival (2006)
 The Wits Theatre 969 Festival (2006)
 State Theatre (2006)
 Artscape Theatre Centre (2006)
 Montecasino (2008)
 Baxter Theatre Centre(2008)
 Afrovibes (Netherlands 2008)
 Drama for Life SA Season (2012)
 SA Schools Festivals (Bloemfontein & Mmpumalanga 2012)
 National Arts Festival, Grahamstown (2014)
 Athenaeum, Port Elizabeth (2014)
 Published by Just Done Productions Publishing   
 Published by Oxford University Press

Happy Endings Are Extra
 Baxter Theatre Centre (2003)
 Grahamstown National Arts Festival (2004)
 Standard Bank National Arts Festival (2004)
 Artscape Theatre Centre (2005)
 Dublin International Gay Theatre Festival (2006)
 Diversionary Theatre, San Diego CA (2007)
 Bailiwick Rep Theatre, Chicago IL (2007)
 Published by Just Done Productions Publishing

Miracle*
 Commissioned by the Glasgow Arts Council
 Published in the anthology Freedom Spring by Waverley Books (Glasgow)

STRIPPED
 Baxter Theatre Centre (2005)

Yes, I Am!: Writing by South African gay men
 Compiled by Robin Malan and Ashraf Johaardien (2010)
 Published by Junkets Publishers

Adaptations

Ecce Homo!
 Adapted from Body Blows: Six Perforformances by Tim Miller
 Grahamstown National Arts Festival (2006)
 The Wits Theatre 969 Festival (2006)

The Quiet Violence of Dreams
Based on the novel by K. Sello Duiker
 Grahamstown National Arts Festival (2008)
 South African National Schools Festival (2008)
 Artscape Theatre (2010)
 Walsh Black Box Theatre, Washington D.C. (2010)
 University of Johannesburg Con Cowan Theatre (2011)

References

External links

 

1974 births
Living people
South African dramatists and playwrights
University of Cape Town alumni
People educated at Atlantic College
People educated at a United World College